John Stone (born July 7, 1979) is a former American football wide receiver. He was signed as an undrafted free agent by the Indianapolis Colts in 2002. He played college football at Wake Forest.

Stone has also been a member of the Oakland Raiders and New England Patriots.

Stone attended Mainland Regional High School in Linwood, New Jersey.

References

External links
 Wake Forest Deamon Deacons bio
 New England Patriots bio

1979 births
Living people
Mainland Regional High School (New Jersey) alumni
Players of American football from New Jersey
American football wide receivers
Wake Forest Demon Deacons football players
Indianapolis Colts players
Oakland Raiders players
New England Patriots players
People from Somers Point, New Jersey
Sportspeople from Atlantic County, New Jersey